The Tasmanian smelt (Retropinna tasmanica) is a small, pelagic freshwater smelt found in lowland streams of Tasmania, Australia.

External links
 Fishes of Australia : Retropinna tasmanica

Tasmanian smelt
Freshwater fish of Tasmania
Endemic fauna of Tasmania
Taxa named by Allan Riverstone McCulloch
Tasmanian smelt